Mary Letitia (Green) Sprague (1886–1978) was a British botanist and bibliographer at Kew Gardens.  In 1938 she married Scottish botanist Thomas Archibald Sprague, the Deputy Keeper of the Kew Herbarium, and together they compiled several supplements to the Index Kewensis.  She was an expert on Loranthaceae. 

She revised Arthur Fenton Hort's translation of Linnaeus' Critica Botanica, for an edition published by the Linnean Society of London in 1938, with an Introduction by Arthur William Hill.

References 

1886 births
1978 deaths
British women scientists
British botanists
British bibliographers
Women bibliographers